FTL Newsfeed, shown on the Sci-Fi Channel, was the channel's first original program. The micro-series format gave viewers 30-second snippets of fictitious news bulletins that were supposed to have come from 150 years in the future. This future timeline was fraught with stories of genetic engineering issues, technology trends, space exploration, future entertainment, right to privacy issues and geopolitical intrigue. The series was created by F. Paul Wilson and Matthew J. Costello and was filmed in New York. The series ended in a cliffhanger in December 1996.

See also
Futurism

References

1992 American television series debuts
1996 American television series endings
Overpopulation fiction
Syfy original programming